Joseph David Green (born November 20, 1948) is a former professional American football defensive back and return specialist for the New York Giants of the National Football League. He attended Bowling Green State University, where he was named the Mid-American Conference Defensive Player of the Year in 1969 as a senior on the Bowling Green Falcons football team. He was undrafted in 1970 and picked up that year by the Giants. Green played for the Giants for two seasons, and returned seven kickoffs for 132 yards. He started in two games on defense in 1971, and recorded the only touchdown of his pro career that year as he returned a fumble for a score against the Green Bay Packers. He is the father of former NFL player Barrett Green.

References

1948 births
Living people
New York Giants players
Bowling Green Falcons football players
Players of American football from Mississippi
American football defensive backs